State Road 568 (SR 568) is a short stub of the Veterans Expressway (SR 589) north of Tampa. The road was built in 1994, but was reassigned as SR 568 in 2001 when SR 589 moved to the new Suncoast Parkway. It connects the aforementioned SR 589 to SR 597. SR 568 is on the segment of the Veterans Expressway that was intended to be extended to Lutz, Florida in the vicinity of the northern interchange with I-75 and I-275.

Route description
SR 568 begins at Exit 13 on the Veterans Expressway northbound, where the main expressway northbound becomes the Suncoast Parkway.  The road heads east as a four lane expressway, ending at its lone interchange at a traffic signal at SR 597.  There is no access to the Suncoast Parkway from SR 568 or vice versa; motorists heading west on SR 568 will be heading south on the Veterans Expressway.  Despite having no tolls on the spur, those using the road will have to pay a toll on the Veterans Expressway.

History
The road was built as a part of the Veterans Expressway, and opened in 1994.  The road was planned to extend eastward to Lutz and I-275, however, local opposition has cancelled the East-West Road.  When the Suncoast Parkway was opened in 2001 as a de facto extension of the Veterans Expressway, the resulting three mile spur was reassigned as SR 568.

Exit list

References

External links

Florida 589 North & Florida 568 - Veterans Expressway (SouthEast Roads.com)

568
568
Unfinished buildings and structures in the United States
Expressways in the Tampa Bay area